Onomacles was an Athenian. Sometime during 412 BC. Onomacles, together with two others, Phrynichus and Scironides, assumed command of a joint Athenian-Argive force.

Battles
A battle was fought against Milesians supported by soldiers of Chalcideus and Tissaphernes, afterwards Onomacles and his two allies continued in preparation for besiege of Miletus. This plan was thwarted by the  arrival of a Peloponnesian and Sicilian fleet, and the three allies instead sailed away to Samos, after receiving advice from Phrynichus.  Not long after, and within the same year, when the Athenians at Samos had been reinforced, Onomacles was dispatched with part of the armament, and with Strombichides and Euctemon, to fight against Chios.

References

 

5th-century BC Athenians
Thirty Tyrants